In category theory, a branch of mathematics, duality is a correspondence between the properties of a category C and the dual properties of the opposite category Cop. Given a statement regarding the category C, by interchanging the source and target of each morphism as well as interchanging the order of composing two morphisms, a corresponding dual statement is obtained regarding the opposite category Cop. Duality, as such, is the assertion that truth is invariant under this operation on statements. In other words, if a statement is true about C, then its dual statement is true about Cop. Also, if a statement is false about C, then its dual has to be false about Cop.

Given a concrete category C, it is often the case that the opposite category Cop per se is abstract. Cop need not be a category that arises from mathematical practice. In this case, another category D is also termed to be in duality with C if D and Cop are equivalent as categories.

In the case when C and its opposite Cop are equivalent, such a category is self-dual.

Formal definition

We define the elementary language of category theory as the two-sorted first order language with objects and morphisms as distinct sorts, together with the relations of an object being the source or target of a morphism and a symbol for composing two morphisms.

Let σ be any statement in this language. We form the dual σop as follows: 
 Interchange each occurrence of "source" in σ with "target".
 Interchange the order of composing morphisms.
Informally, these conditions state that the dual of a statement is formed by reversing arrows and compositions.

Duality is the observation that σ is true for some category C if and only if σop is true for Cop.

Examples

 A morphism  is a monomorphism if  implies . Performing the dual operation, we get the statement that  implies  For a morphism , this is precisely what it means for f to be an epimorphism. In short, the property of being a monomorphism is dual to the property of being an epimorphism.

Applying duality, this means that a morphism in some category C is a monomorphism if and only if the reverse morphism in the opposite category Cop is an epimorphism.

 An example comes from reversing the direction of inequalities in a partial order. So if X is a set and ≤ a partial order relation, we can define a new partial order relation ≤new by

 x ≤new y if and only if y ≤ x.

This example on orders is a special case, since partial orders correspond to a certain kind of category in which Hom(A,B) can have at most one element. In applications to logic, this then looks like a very general description of negation (that is, proofs run in the opposite direction). For example, if we take the opposite of a lattice, we will find that meets and joins have their roles interchanged. This is an abstract form of De Morgan's laws, or of duality applied to lattices.

 Limits and colimits are dual notions.
 Fibrations and cofibrations are examples of dual notions in algebraic topology and homotopy theory. In this context, the duality is often called Eckmann–Hilton duality.

See also
 Adjoint functor
 Dual object
 Duality (mathematics)
 Opposite category
 Pulation square

References

 
 
 
 
 

Category theory
Category theory